Horace Tanner Allen (June 11, 1899 – July 5, 1981), nicknamed "Pug", was an outfielder in Major League Baseball.

Allen was born on July 5, 1899 in DeLand, Florida.

He played for the Georgia Tech baseball team. He also played in 4 games for the 1919 Brooklyn Robins, had 7 at-bats, and failed to get a hit.

References

External links
  or Baseball-almanac
 

1899 births
1981 deaths
American football fullbacks
Major League Baseball outfielders
Beaumont Exporters players
Brooklyn Robins players
Dallas Steers players
DeLand Red Hats players
Georgia Tech Yellow Jackets baseball players
Georgia Tech Yellow Jackets football players
Greenville Togs players
Indianapolis Indians players
New Orleans Pelicans (baseball) players
Sanford Celeryfeds players
Stetson Hatters baseball coaches
Stetson Hatters football coaches
Stetson Hatters men's basketball coaches
People from DeLand, Florida
Coaches of American football from Florida
Players of American football from Florida
Baseball coaches from Florida
Baseball players from Florida
Basketball coaches from Florida